Okinawa Cellular Stadium, originally known as Naha City Ohnoyama Baseball Stadium, is a multi-purpose stadium in Naha, Japan.  It is currently used mostly for baseball matches.  The stadium was originally opened in 1959, but was renovated in 2010. It has a capacity of 30,000 spectators.

References

External links
Venue homepage
Stadium picture
Stadium information

Baseball venues in Japan
Multi-purpose stadiums in Japan
Sports venues in Okinawa Prefecture
Naha
Sports venues completed in 1959
1959 establishments in Japan